Lu Zhi (before late 140s?–192), courtesy name Zigan, was a Chinese historian, military general, philosopher, and politician during the Eastern Han dynasty. According to the Records of the Three Kingdoms, he was the mentor of Liu Bei and Gongsun Zan. He was described as a tall man (approximately 1.89 metres or 6'2") with a sonorous voice.

Life
Lu Zhi was born in Zhuo Commandery  Zhuōjùn; present-day Zhuozhou, Hebei). He studied under Ma Rong and Zheng Xuan was one of his classmates. As Ma Rong was a consort kin, his family was wealthy and his household had many songstresses and dancers. During his time studying with Ma Rong, Lu Zhi concentrated on his studies and never once looked at the songstresses and dancers, earning his teacher's respect.

In 175, a rebellion led by "barbarians" in Jiujiang broke out. On account of his literary and martial abilities, Lu Zhi was made Administrator of Jiujiang. The rebels surrendered to Lu peacefully; Lu later resigned, citing an illness.　　 

He was among the most pre-eminent scholars of the era, known for his study of texts on Chinese rituals and his assistance in compiling the Han Records of the Eastern Lodge   Dōngguān Hànjì). His students included Gao You, later a scholarly commentator on the Chinese classics; Liu Bei, later the emperor of Shu during the Three Kingdoms; his relative Liu Deran; and Gongsun Zan, later a regional warlord. While in the service of the Han government, Lu Zhi led imperial forces to attack the Yellow Turban rebels in 184, but was removed from command after the eunuch Zuo Feng made false accusations against him; Lu Zhi had refused to bribe Zuo Feng.

Huangfu Song, who took over command of the imperial troops from Lu Zhi, continued to use Lu as a strategist and reported his contributions to the imperial court. Thus, in the same year, Lu Zhi regained his post as Master of Writing (尚书). Later, he warned against Dong Zhuo's sudden displacement of Emperor Shao.

After Dong Zhuo's rise to power, Lu eventually resigned from court, citing his old age and ill health.

Family and descendants
Lu Zhi's youngest son, Lu Yu, later served in the state of Cao Wei during the Three Kingdoms period. Lu Yu had at least 2 sons: Lu Qin and Lu Ting. Lu Ting's son Lu Zhi (盧志; note the different character from his great-grandfather's name) was a confidant and strategist of Sima Ying, one of the princes associated with the War of the Eight Princes.

See also
 Lists of people of the Three Kingdoms

References

Citations

Bibliography
 Chen Shou. Records of the Three Kingdoms (Sanguozhi).
 .
 Fan Ye. Book of the Later Han (Houhanshu).
 Pei Songzhi. Annotations to Records of the Three Kingdoms (Sanguozhi zhu).

159 births
192 deaths
Han dynasty generals from Hebei
Han dynasty historians
Han dynasty philosophers
Han dynasty politicians from Hebei
Historians from Hebei
Liu Bei and associates
Lu clan of Fanyang
Philosophers from Hebei
Politicians from Baoding
Political office-holders in Anhui
Yuan Shao and associates